= Ralph Jerome Von Braun Selz =

American murderer

Ralph Jerome Von Braun Selz (Note: Bosworth gives his name as Jerome Braun von Selz, and says he was born Ralph Jerome Selz.) (December 15, 1909 – ????), alias Slipton J. Fell, (Note: According to Bosworth, he also went by the aliases Ralph Sells and Charles Oliver.) was a drifter convicted of murder in the death of Ada Brownell French Rice, the estranged wife of the mayor of Nome, Alaska. Labeled "The Laughing Killer" by the press, Selz continuously filed petitions for his release and made several successful escapes from prison only to be recaptured each time.

== Early life ==
Selz was born in San Francisco, California, and after a long period of drifting, returned there in late 1935 and met Rice who, shortly thereafter, invited him to share a small cottage with her in Palo Alto, California. Selz was 30 years younger than Rice, but considered himself a Romeo of sorts and seemed to be a perfect match for her.

== Crimes ==
On February 27, 1936, Selz was arrested on auto theft charges and police discovered he had been forging Ada Rice's signature and cashing checks on her account. Although Selz didn't know it, Rice had been reported missing. Police questioned him for weeks and he finally confessed to killing her and burying her body in the Santa Cruz mountains.

Selz served more than 30 years in California prisons for the murder of Rice. He was known as "The Laughing Killer" because when he revealed the location of Mrs. Rice's grave in the Santa Cruz mountains he couldn't stop giggling. He later claimed that he had been abused by police interrogators and given "truth serum" medication during several days of intense interrogation, which caused him to laugh inappropriately. That claim was a basis of the court case People v. Von Braun Selz.

Selz escaped from prison several times. The first time was about 1940. He had taught himself to speak five different languages while in prison. He fled to Canada and joined the Canadian Army under a phony name during the Second World War. Because of his language skills he was put in charge of a "displaced persons" camp in Quebec. These were European refugees from German-occupied Europe. He interviewed many of these refugees and gained invaluable information about conditions in Europe.

His information was very useful for Canadian and British military intelligence services. He received a number of decorations for his service and was written about in the Canadian press. This was his downfall. California prison authorities found out where he was hiding and he was arrested and extradited back to California to serve out his life sentence. However, the Canadian government was so grateful for his service that for many years afterward, whenever Selz would appear before the Parole Board, Canada would send a delegation to speak on his behalf and urge his release on parole. However, because Selz was suspected of being a serial killer and was suspected in the death of a total of five women, although he had only been convicted of the murder of his lover Mrs. Rice, he did not succeed in getting a parole until the late 1960s.

He was returned to prison for violating his parole after a couple of years of freedom. He had attempted to get Social Security benefits using multiple Social Security numbers.

Selz was paroled again about 1970 because of heart disease. His ultimate fate is unknown.

== Books ==
- Los Angeles Times March 11, 1936: ¨Confession In Slaying - Killer Leads to Woman's Grave and Tells Murder of Her Man Friend¨
- Los Angeles Times March 11, 1936: ¨Five Grisly Murders Checked by Police Tonight as Jaunty Jerome Von Braun Seiz (sp), 27-year-old Adventurer, Wearily Related Details of Two Killings¨
- Los Angeles Times March 12, 1936 :"Bay Death Clue Found - Suspected Killer Points to Where He Threw Body of Victim¨
- Los Angeles Times March 17, 1936:¨ Killer Selz Linked With New Death - Ex-Hotel Porter Identifies Man as Companion of Another Slain Woman¨
- People v. Von Braun Selz, 291 P.2d 186, 138 Cal.App.2d 205 (Cal.App. 1 Dist., 1955)
